Itagnostus is a genus of trilobite restricted to the Middle Cambrian. Its remains have been found in Asia, Australia, Europe, and North America.

Distribution 
 Itagnostus elkedrensis occurs in the Middle Cambrian of Australia (Ptychagnostus praecurrens-zone, Xystridura templetonensis-zone, and Dinesus-stage, Elkedra; Triplagnostus gibbus-zone, Sandover Beds; both Northern Territory), the Russian Federation (Kounamkites-zone, Nekekit River; Liostracus allachjunensis-zone, Lena River).
 Itagnostus comis is found in the Middle Cambrian of Australia (Triplagnostus gibbus-zone, Sandover Beds, Northern Territory).

* Itagnostus gaspensis gaspensis is reported from the Middle Cambrian of the United States (Geddes Formation, Nevada; Ptychagnostus atavus-zone, Wheeler Formation, Drum Mountains, Utah), Canada (upper part, Grosses Roches, St. Laurence, Quebec), Russian Federation (Tomagnostus fissus-zone, Lena River).

 Itagnostus gaspensis taitzuhoensis has been excavated from the Middle Cambrian of Antarctica (lower part, Shackleton Mountains), Australia (Ptychagnostus praecurrens-zone, Elkedra, Northern Territory), North-China (Bailiella-Lioparia-zone, Hsuchang Formation).
 Itagnostus interstrictus interstrictus is present in the Middle Cambrian of Canada (Ptychagnostus punctuosus-zone, Cow head Group, Newfoundland), the United States (Bolaspidella (P. atavus)-zone, Tatonduk River, Hillard Peak, Alaska; lower part of the Bolaspidella-zone, Western-Utah; Wheeler Shale, Antelope Spring, House Range, Utah), the Russian Federation (Malokuonamsky Horizon, Tomagnostus fissus-zone, and Liostracus allachjunensis-zone, all Lena River).

* Itagnostus krusei is found in the Middle Cambrian of the Russian Federation (Kounamkites-zone, Lena River).

 Itagnostus oepiki has been collected in the Middle Cambrian of Australia (Triplagnostus gibbus-zone, Sandover Beds; Xystridura templetonensis-zone, Elkedra; both Northern Territory).
 Itagnostus walleyae is reported from the Middle Cambrian of Australia (Ptychagnostus praecurrens-zone, Elkedra, Northern Territory).
 Itagnostus sp. has been collected in the Middle Cambrian of the Russian Federation (Liosttracus allachjunensis-zone, Lena River).

References

External links
Peronopsis in the Paleobiology Database
Peronopsis at the Field Museum's Evolving Planet

Peronopsidae
Agnostida genera
Cambrian trilobites
Cambrian animals of Asia
Trilobites of Asia
Trilobites of Oceania
Trilobites of Europe
Trilobites of North America
Fossil taxa described in 1979
Paleozoic life of British Columbia

pl:Peronopsis
Cambrian genus extinctions